Caspar Abel (14 July 1676 – 11 January 1763) was a German theologian, historian and poet.

Abel was born in Hindenburg in der Altmark, the son of a pastor, and gained his theological education in Braunschweig and Helmstedt. In 1696 he became rector in Osterburg, in 1698 at the Johannisschule in Halberstadt. In 1718 he became pastor in Westdorf near Aschersleben where he died in 1763. His son Joachim Gottwalt Abel (1723–1806) also became a pastor.

Note: From 1748 to 1764 he was assisted by Johann Gottfried Bürger, the father of poet Gottfried August Bürger.

Publications

 historical works:
 Preußische und Brandenburgische Reichs- und Staatshistorie, 1710, 2 volumes, 8°
 Preußische und Brandenburgische Reichs- und Staatsgeographie, 1711, 2 volumes, 8°, additions in 1747.
 Deutsche und Sächsische Altertümer, 1729–32, 3 volumes, 8°
 Stift-, Stadt- und Landchronica des Fürstenthums Halberstadt, 1745, 4°
 poems:
 Jubelfest des Brandenburgischen Unterthanen, 1700
 Abbildung eines rechtschaffenen Predigers, 1710
 translations:
Ovid's Heroids, 1704, 1723
Boileau's satires, 1729–32, 2 volumes

Sources

 Allgemeine Deutsche Biographie - online version at Wikisource

See also
Friedrich Gottfried Abel, his son

1676 births
1763 deaths
People from Stendal (district)
German Lutheran theologians
18th-century German Lutheran clergy
18th-century German historians
People from the Principality of Halberstadt
University of Helmstedt alumni
German male non-fiction writers